Darren Minchington is a former Australian rules football player who played with the St Kilda Football Club and Hawthorn Football Club in the Australian Football League.

AFL career
He made his debut on 9 August 2013 against Hawthorn in Round 20 of the 2013 AFL season. 

Originally from Dromana, Victoria, Minchington attended Padua College. He started his senior football career at St Kilda's VFL affiliate club Sandringham in 2012, but suffered a hip injury after playing nine games, ending his season. He kicked two goals in two games for the St Kilda Football Club. He was dropped after his second game against the Sydney Swans.

He was delisted from Hawthorn a year later without playing a game. 

Minchington signed a one-year rookie contract as part of the pre-season supplemental selection period (SSP) following a long-term knee injury to Will Golds.
 Minchington made his Hawks debut and played his first AFL game since round 10, 2017. He was selected to play  at the Sydney Showground Stadium. 
 Minchington was delisted at the conclusion of the 2020 AFL season, after playing 4 games with the Hawks.

Statistics

|- style=background:#EAEAEA
| 2012 ||  || 41
| 0 || — || — || — || — || — || — || — || — || — || — || — || — || — || — || —
|-
| 2013 ||  || 41
| 2 || 2 || 1 || 10 || 7 || 17 || 8 || 2 || 1.0 || 0.5 || 5.0 || 3.5 || 8.5 || 4.0 || 1.0 || 0
|- style=background:#EAEAEA
| 2014 ||  || 41
| 3 || 4 || 1 || 20 || 8 || 28 || 7 || 4 || 1.3 || 0.3 || 6.7 || 2.7 || 9.3 || 2.3 || 1.3 || 0
|-
| 2015 ||  || 41
| 5 || 6 || 4 || 24 || 23 || 47 || 10 || 15 || 1.2 || 0.8 || 4.8 || 4.6 || 9.4 || 2.0 || 3.0 || 0
|- style=background:#EAEAEA
| 2016 ||  || 41
| 13 || 6 || 5 || 63 || 83 || 146 || 26 || 54 || 0.5 || 0.4 || 4.8 || 6.4 || 11.2 || 2.0 || 4.2 || 0
|-
| 2017 ||  || 41
| 5 || 4 || 4 || 29 || 40 || 69 || 13 || 20 || 0.8 || 0.8 || 5.8 || 8.0 || 13.8 || 2.6 || 4.0 || 0
|- style=background:#EAEAEA
| 2018 ||  || 41
| 0 || — || — || — || — || — || — || — || — || — || — || — || — || — || — || —
|-
| 2019 ||  || 38
| 0 || — || — || — || — || — || — || — || — || — || — || — || — || — || — || —
|- style=background:#EAEAEA
| 2020 ||  || 38
| 4 || 2 || 2 || 24 || 15 || 39 || 6 || 5 || 0.5 || 0.5 || 6.0 || 3.8 || 9.8 || 1.5 || 1.3 || 0
|- class="sortbottom"
! colspan="3" | Career
! 32 !! 24 !! 17 !! 170 !! 176 !! 346 !! 70 !! 100 !! 0.8 !! 0.5 !! 5.3 !! 5.5 !! 10.8 !! 2.2 !! 3.1 !! 0
|}

Notes

References

External links

1993 births
Living people
Dandenong Stingrays players
Sandringham Football Club players
St Kilda Football Club players
Hawthorn Football Club players
Box Hill Football Club players
Australian rules footballers from Melbourne

People educated at Padua College (Melbourne)
People from Dromana, Victoria